William G. McCallum (born 1956 in Sydney, Australia) is a University Distinguished Professor of Mathematics and was Head of the Department of Mathematics at the University of Arizona from 2009 to 2013.

Education and professional work 

He was educated at North Sydney Boys High School. He received his Ph.D. in Mathematics from Harvard University in 1984, under the supervision of Barry Mazur. After spending two years at the University of California, Berkeley, and one at the Mathematical Sciences Research Institute in Berkeley, he joined the faculty at the University of Arizona in 1987. In 1989 he joined the Harvard calculus consortium, and is the lead author of the consortium's multivariable calculus and college algebra texts. In 1993–94 he spent a year at the Institut des Hautes Études Scientifiques, and in 1995–96 he spent a year at the Institute for Advanced Study on a Centennial Fellowship from the American Mathematical Society.

In 2006 he founded the Institute for Mathematics & Education at the University of Arizona. He was Director of the Institute until 2009 and again starting in 2013. In 2009–2010 he was one of the lead writers for the Common Core State Standards in Mathematics. 
His professional interests include arithmetical algebraic geometry and mathematics education.

Selected honors and awards 
2012: Fellow of the American Mathematical Society.
2012: The Mary P. Dolciani Award, administered by the Mathematical Association of America
2012: The American Mathematical Society Distinguished Public Service Award
2006:  University of Arizona College of Science Galileo Circle Fellow. 
2005: National Science Foundation’s Director's Award for Distinguished Teaching Scholars
1996: The University of Arizona College of Science Innovation in Teaching Award
1995: The American Mathematical Society Centennial Research Fellowship.

Current projects 

	Institute for Mathematics and Education
	Common Core State Standards in Mathematics
	Illustrative Mathematics Project
	Standards Progressions for the Common Core
	Tools for the Common Core Blog
	The Klein Project
	Mathematical Models at the University of Arizona

References

External links 

The U.S. Common Core State Standards, paper presented at ICME 12, Seoul, Korea (slides for this talk)
Restoring and Balancing, in Usiskin, Anderson, and Zotto (eds), Future Curricular Trends in School Algebra and Geometry, Information Age Publishing (2010)

Living people
1956 births
Australian mathematicians
University of Arizona faculty
Harvard University alumni
Fellows of the American Mathematical Society
People educated at North Sydney Boys High School